St. Onge Township is the sole township of Lawrence County, South Dakota, United States; the rest of the county is unorganized territory. The population was 326 as of the 2020 census. It lies on the northern edge of the county.

References

External links
Official map by the United States Census Bureau; Lawrence County listed on page 3

Saint Onge
Townships in South Dakota